Godson Kyeremeh (born 14 June 2000) is a French professional footballer who plays as a midfielder for  club Caen.

Career
On 18 January 2020, Kyeremeh signed his first professional contract with Caen for three years. He made his professional debut for Caen in a 5–0 Coupe de France loss to Montpellier on 19 January 2020. Kyeremeh was loaned to Annecy in the Championnat National on 1 February 2021. On 30 July 2022, Kyeremeh made his Ligue 2 debut as a substitute in a 1–0 away win over Nîmes. He scored a last-minute goal to win the match for Caen.

Personal life
Born in France, Kyeremeh is of Ghanaian descent.

References

External links
 
 SM Caen Profile
 LFP Profile

2000 births
Living people
Sportspeople from Melun
French footballers
Black French sportspeople
French sportspeople of Ghanaian descent
Association football midfielders
Stade Malherbe Caen players
FC Annecy players
Championnat National 3 players
Footballers from Seine-et-Marne
21st-century French people